The oligodynamic effect (from Greek oligos, "few", and dynamis, "force") is a biocidal effect of metals, especially heavy metals, that occurs even in low concentrations.

In modern times, the effect was observed by Carl Nägeli, although he did not identify the cause. Brass doorknobs and silverware both exhibit this effect to an extent.

Mechanism 
The metals react with thiol (-SH) or amine (-NH(1,2,3)) groups of proteins, a mode of action to which microorganisms may develop resistance. Such resistance may be transmitted by plasmids.

List of uses

Aluminium 
Aluminium triacetate (Burow's solution) is used as an astringent mild antiseptic.

Antimony 
Orthoesters of diarylstibinic acids are fungicides and bactericides, used in paints, plastics, and fibers. Trivalent organic antimony was used in therapy for schistosomiasis.

Arsenic 
For many decades, arsenic was used medicinally to treat syphilis. It is still used in sheep dips, rat poisons, wood preservatives, weed killers, and other pesticides. Arsenic is poisonous if it enters the human body.

Barium 
Barium polysulfide is a fungicide and acaricide used in fruit and grape growing.

Bismuth 
Bismuth compounds have been used because of their astringent, antiphlogistic, bacteriostatic, and disinfecting actions. In dermatology bismuth subgallate is still used in vulnerary salves and powders as well as in antimycotics. In the past, bismuth has also been used to treat syphilis and malaria.

Boron 
Boric acid esters derived from glycols (example, organo-borate formulation, Biobor JF) are being used for the control of microorganisms in fuel systems containing water.

Copper 

Brass vessels release a small amount of copper ions into stored water, thus killing fecal bacterial counts as high as 1 million bacteria per milliliter.

Copper sulfate mixed with lime (Bordeaux mixture) is used as a fungicide and antihelminthic. Copper sulfate is used chiefly to destroy green algae (algicide) that grow in reservoirs, stock ponds, swimming pools, and fish tanks. Copper 8-hydroxyquinoline is sometimes included in paint to prevent mildew.

Paint containing copper is used on boat bottoms to prevent barnacle growth (biofouling).

Gold 
Gold is used in dental inlays and inhibits the growth of bacteria.

Lead 
Physicians prescribed various forms of lead to heal ailments ranging from constipation to infectious diseases such as the plague. Lead was also used to preserve or sweeten wine. Lead arsenate is used in insecticides and herbicides. Some organic lead compounds are used as industrial biocides: thiomethyl triphenyllead is used as an antifungal agent, cotton preservative, and lubricant additive; thiopropyl triphenyllead as a rodent repellant; tributyllead acetate as a wood and cotton preservative; tributyllead imidazole as a lubricant additive and cotton preservative.

Mercury 
Phenylmercuric borate and acetate were used for disinfecting mucous membranes at an effective concentration of 0.07% in aqueous solutions. Due to toxicological and ecotoxicological reasons phenylmercury salts are no longer in use. However, some surgeons use mercurochrome despite toxicological objections. Mercurochrome is still available to purchase in Australia to use on minor wounds. Dental amalgam used in fillings inhibits bacterial reproduction.

Organic mercury compounds have been used as topical disinfectants (thimerosal, nitromersol, and merbromin) and preservatives in medical preparations (thimerosal) and grain products (both methyl and ethyl mercurials). Mercury was used in the treatment of syphilis. Calomel was commonly used in infant teething powders in the 1930s and 1940s. Mercurials are also used agriculturally as insecticides and fungicides.

Nickel 
The toxicity of nickel to bacteria, yeasts, and fungi differs considerably.

Silver 

The metabolism of bacteria is adversely affected by silver ions at concentrations of 0.01–0.1 mg/L. Therefore, even less soluble silver compounds, such as silver chloride, also act as bactericides or germicides, but not the much less soluble silver sulfide. In the presence of atmospheric oxygen, metallic silver also has a bactericidal effect due to the formation of silver oxide, which is soluble enough to cause it. Even objects with a solid silver surface (e.g., table silver, silver coins, or silver foil) have a bactericidal effect. Silver drinking vessels were carried by military commanders on expeditions for protection against disease. It was once common to place silver foil or even silver coins on wounds for the same reason.

Silver sulfadiazine is used as an antiseptic ointment for extensive burns. An equilibrium dispersion of colloidal silver with dissolved silver ions can be used to purify drinking water at sea. Silver is incorporated into medical implants and devices such as catheters. Surfacine (silver iodide) is a relatively new antimicrobial for application to surfaces. Silver-impregnated wound dressings have proven especially useful against antibiotic-resistant bacteria. Silver nitrate is used as a hemostatic, antiseptic and astringent. At one time, many states required that the eyes of newborns be treated with a few drops of silver nitrate to guard against an infection of the eyes called gonorrheal neonatal ophthalmia, which the infants might have contracted as they passed through the birth canal. Silver ions are increasingly incorporated into many hard surfaces, such as plastics and steel, as a way to control microbial growth on items such as toilet seats, stethoscopes, and even refrigerator doors. Among the newer products being sold are plastic food containers infused with silver nanoparticles, which are intended to keep food fresher, and silver-infused athletic shirts and socks, which claim to minimize odors.

Thallium 
Thallium compounds such as thallium sulfate have been used for impregnating wood and leather to kill fungal spores and bacteria, and for the protection of textiles from attack by moths. Thallium sulfate has been used as a depilatory and in the treatment of venereal disease, skin fungal infections, and tuberculosis.

Tin 
Tetrabutyltin is used as an antifouling paint for ships, for the prevention of slimes in industrial recirculating water systems, for combating freshwater snails that cause bilharzia, as a wood and textile preservative, and as a disinfectant. Tricyclohexyltin hydroxide is used as an acaricide. Triphenyltin hydroxide and triphenyltin acetate are used as fungicides.

Zinc 
Zinc oxide is used as a weak antiseptic and in paints as a white pigment and mold-growth inhibitor. Zinc chloride is a common ingredient in mouthwashes and deodorants, and zinc pyrithione is an ingredient in antidandruff shampoos. Galvanized (zinc-coated) fittings on roofs impede the growth of algae. Copper- and zinc-treated shingles are available. Zinc iodide and zinc sulfate are used as topical antiseptics.

Safety 
Besides the individual toxic effects of each metal, a wide range of metals are nephrotoxic in humans and/or in animals. Some metals and their compounds are carcinogenic to humans. A few metals, such as lead and mercury, can cross the placental barrier and adversely affect fetal development. Several (cadmium, zinc, copper, and mercury) can induce special protein complexes called metallothioneins.

See also 
 Antimicrobial properties of copper
 Copper-silver ionization
 Medical uses of silver

References 

Biology and pharmacology of chemical elements
Biocides